Line 6 of the Beijing Subway is a rapid transit line in Beijing. The line runs from Jin'anqiao in Shijingshan District to Lucheng in Tongzhou District. It serves important residential areas such as Changying, Chaoqing, and Dingfuzhuang, in addition to important commercial and business areas such as Financial Street, Beijing CBD and the sub-administrative center in Tongzhou District. Like Line 7, Line 6 provides relief to the parallel Line 1, which is the second most used subway line in Beijing, after Line 10. Line 6 is the second longest subway line in Beijing (only Line 10 is longer). A complete journey from end to end takes about an hour and 25 minutes on a local train and express trains reducing end to end travel time by 7 minutes.

Line 6 uses 8-car Type B train sets accommodating 1,960 people.
Line 6 also has the deepest station in the network, Dongsi station, which is  underground. The line uses  overhead catenary as opposed to  third rail used on other lines. Some of the station arrangements were the first of their kind in Beijing. Beijing's first split platform station, Nanluoguxiang station, and stations equipped with passing tracks, opened on Line 6.

Ridership 
Line 6 was projected to have a short term volume of 700,000 passengers per day and a long term daily passenger traffic of 1.4 million passengers. Though due to its alignment through some of Beijing's densest residential neighborhoods and paralleling the overcapacity and busy Line 1, some industry leaders believed that the average daily passenger flow of the line may reach 1.4 million passengers per day sooner than expected. Within the first few months of operation, weekday ridership was at 320,000 passengers. However, by 2014, daily ridership had risen to 700,000 with sections operating at 100% capacity during rush hour. Authorities responded by adding more trains and shortening headway to reduce crowding on the line. By 2019, daily average weekday ridership on Line 6 exceeds 1 million riders.

Stations 
Stations from west to east:

History

Planning 
Line 6 was originally planned to be an east–west line passing under Chaoyang Avenue continuing straight westward. However, this alignment would make the central section of Line 6 tunnel extremely close to the Forbidden City. Issues of historic conservation and protection were raised against the proposed alignment. To avoid damaging cultural relics in the area, the entire western and middle section of line 6 was shifted  northward to Ping'an Avenue, forming the route of Line 6 today. As of October 2007, Line 6 was planned to feature both express and local stations, but those plans have not been incorporated into the construction of Phase I. Line 6 started construction on December 8, 2007, as one of the "horizontal" east–west lines of the "three-ring, four horizontal and five vertical and seven radial" Beijing Subway masterplan. Construction is planned in three phases, the first phase in central Beijing, followed by extensions into the eastern and western suburbs.

Phase I

In Phase I, Line 6 runs  from Haidian Wuluju in Haidian District to Caofang in Chaoyang District following Linglong Road, Sanlihe Road, Chaoyang North Road, the west bank of the Grand Canal, and Yunhe East Road. In Phase I, there were 21 stations, including  station, which opened on 18 March 2023.

Construction began in December 2007 and was completed in 2012. On March 22, 2010, the tunneling work on Line 6 commenced near Shilipu in Chaoyang District. Total investment for Phase I was estimated at ¥19.7 billion.

After residents along the route raised concerns about train noise, planners reconsidered and ultimately decided to keep all of Phase I underground. This made the first phase of Line 6 completely underground.

Phase II (eastern extension) 

As of November 2010, plans for Phase II contained plans for distinct express and local stations. Beiyunhedong station opened on 30 December 2018. Like Phase I, the Phase II track is entirely underground.

The extension was designed to have express and local services using passing tracks at select stations. However, due to a shortage of rolling stock, express services have yet to be implemented when the Phase II opens in 2014. In 2018, the government announced that sufficient rolling stock had arrived to begin implementing an express service. Express services started operating on March 31, 2020.

Phase III (western extension) 
Line 6 was originally planned to terminate at Cishousi station with Line S1 continuing the line westward. In 2011, because of issues of low capacity and electromagnetic radiation concerns of Maglev technology, city planning authorities proposed to detach several stations from Line S1. All stations are underground. This replaced the Line S1 section between Cishousi and Pingguoyuan station. Later the plan was revised with Line 6 being further extended westward beyond Pingguoyuan to Jin'anqiao station, paralleling Line S1. The revision was formalized and submitted to the National Development and Reform Commission for review in March 2012. Phase III opened in 2018, along with Beiyunhedong station, a Phase II station.

Plans for an interchange with Line 1 at Pingguoyuan were delayed by a renovation of the station. When Line 6 Phase III entered operation, Pingguoyuan station was not opened. In December 2021, the station was opened as an interchange between Line 6 and Line S1. The station for Line 1 will open in 2023.

Opening timeline

Future Development

South extension of Phase II
Construction started on 30 August 2022. It is expected to open in 2025.

Rolling Stock

References 

Beijing Subway lines
Railway lines opened in 2012
2012 establishments in China
1500 V DC railway electrification